The Wasabies (Mongolian: Васабис; stylized in all caps) is a Mongolian girl group formed through the first season of Edutainment TV‘s version of the French reality television show Star Academy (Mongolian: Оддын Академи). The group consists of four members: BUIKA, ANUKA, WINDY, and JASMINE.

The girl group debuted with their extended play (EP) Girls Generation on December 7, 2018.

Name
The group's name was given by their producer and songwriter Naranzun. It is based on Japanese spicy paste “Wasabi”, which is commonly served with sushi. “The Wasabies” shows the group's strong, unique, and spicy concept.

History

Formation through Star Academy 
The Wasabies was formed through the first season of reality television show Star Academy (Mongolian: Оддын Академи), which aired on Edutainment TV. Out of an initial twelve contestants, the final five were announced to debut as a group. Prior to appearing on the show, Buyandulam was a dancer and a choreographer under Aim4r Production.

The group was sponsored with ₮100 million (approximately $35000) by Mongolian telecom company G-Mobile. Later, the group was participated in Mongol TV's version of the American reality television show Shark Tank (Mongolian: Шарк Танк) and won an investment of ₮100 million (approximately $35000) from Oyungerel, chief executive officer (CEO) of "Petrovis Group" and Enkhtuvshin, vice president of "MCS Group". The group was signed to a Mongolian record label Leto Music Company.

Debut with Girls Generation 
The group's debut extended play (EP) Girls Generation was released on December 7, 2018, by Leto Music Company and Amantun Music Group Co., Ltd, after releasing the music videos for “Girls Generation”, “U-gui (Don't)”, “Bestie”, and “Love #1”. Later on March 20, 2019, they released the music video for “Toy", and on August 22, 2019, they released the music video for "Runaway”, announcing the member Angelina would be taking a break from the group. After releasing the extended play (EP), The Wasabies held their first fan meeting at White Rock Center in May 4, 2019.

New year special single 
The group released a new year special single "Shine On Irlee" with music video on December 9, 2019.

Comeback with Time Machine 
On June 19, 2020, the group announced their comeback with second extended play (EP) Time Machine. The extended play (EP) would have six tracks, "This Is Love" as its lead single. The music video for "This Is Love" was released on June 26, 2020. Their second single from the album “Xac” was released on September 24, 2020. The project was then cancelled due to members leaving the group.

Butterflies Project 
The group announced their new project Butterflies with new members WINDY and JASMINE, on August 13, 2021, through their official Youtube channel. The first release of their project "Girlfriend" was released on August 16, 2021. The following single "Somehow" was released on January 21, 2023. The release was featured as a soundtrack for "Yaaraltai Tuslamjiin Tasgiinhan", a Mongolian television series produced by Nomadia Pictures and Ufilm Production.

Japanese debut 
It was announced that the group would be making their debut in Japan, on February 26, 2022, through their official Youtube channel. In August, 2022, the group reportedly went to Japan to prepare for their debut. Their Japanese debut single "JELLY BEANS", in collaboration with Japanese shoe brand with the same name, was released on September 26, 2022, on their official Japanese Youtube channel.

Members 

 Buyandulam (Буяндулам)
 Anujin (Анужин)
WINDY 
JASMINE
Former members

Enkhgerel (Энхгэрэл)
 Aminkhuslen (Аминхүслэн)
Angelina (Ангелина)

Discography

Extended plays

Singles

References 

Girl groups
Mongolian musical groups
Mongolian women singers
Musical groups established in 2018